Goode Beach is a locality in Western Australia.

Demographics
The median age of persons in Goode Beach was 63 years. There were less males than females, with 47.1% of the population male and 52.9% female. The average household size was 2 people per household.

References

Great Southern (Western Australia)